Stackpole Rocks is a group of rocks, the largest of them linked by a spit to the east extremity of South Beaches in Byers Peninsula, Livingston Island in the South Shetland Islands, Antarctica.  The area was visited by early 19th century sealers.

The feature is named after Edouard Stackpole, Curator of the Marine Historical Association, Mystic, Connecticut, historian of early American whaling and sealing in the South Shetlands.

Location

See also 
 Composite Antarctic Gazetteer
 List of Antarctic islands south of 60° S
 SCAR
 Territorial claims in Antarctica

Maps
 L.L. Ivanov. Antarctica: Livingston Island and Greenwich, Robert, Snow and Smith Islands. Scale 1:120000 topographic map.  Troyan: Manfred Wörner Foundation, 2009.

References

External links
Stackpole Rocks. Composite Antarctic Gazetteer

Rock formations of Livingston Island